Two Japanese destroyers have been named Oite:

 , a  launched in 1906 and scrapped in 1924
 , a  launched in 1924 and sunk in 1944

Japanese Navy ship names
Imperial Japanese Navy ship names